Ivo Šeparović (born 1 January 1961) is a Croatian retired international football player.

Club career
He started his professional career playing in the Yugoslav First League, today a Croatian giants Hajduk Split. In January 1982, he moved to a lower league NK Solin, before returning to the First League in 1984, when he played half season in Serbian club Spartak Subotica. Next, he returned to Dalmatia to play in GOŠK Dubrovnik where he will stay until 1989, and become an influential player. Then, he moved to Slovenian club Olimpija Ljubljana, where he'll stay for two seasons, until the break-up of Yugoslavia. He returned to Dubrovnik, playing now in Croatian First League where he ended his playing career.

International career
He played one match for the Croatia national football team in Jun 1991 against Slovenia, coming on as a 46th-minute substitute for Ivan Cvjetković. As Croatia was still part of Yugoslavia at the time, the game is deemed not official by FIFA.

References

External links
 
 Profile at prvaliga.si
 

1961 births
Living people
People from Vela Luka
Association football midfielders
Yugoslav footballers
Croatian footballers
Croatia international footballers
HNK Hajduk Split players
NK Solin players
FK Spartak Subotica players
NK GOŠK Dubrovnik players
NK Olimpija Ljubljana (1945–2005) players
HNK Segesta players
Yugoslav First League players
Yugoslav Second League players
Slovenian PrvaLiga players
Croatian Football League players
Croatian expatriate footballers
Expatriate footballers in Slovenia
Croatian expatriate sportspeople in Slovenia
HNK Hajduk Split non-playing staff